Isaac Hardenbergh House, also known as The Hardenbergh Manor, is a historic home located at Roxbury in Delaware County, New York, United States. It was built about 1790 and consists of a 2-story, five-bay center-entrance stone structure with a smaller -story frame addition built about 1820.  Also on the property is a board and batten horse and carriage barn, the ruins of a large dairy barn, and gateposts partially constructed of millstones.

It was listed on the National Register of Historic Places in 1994.

References

External links
Zadock Pratt Museum - "History Feature": The Hardenbergh Manor (1780) - Rte 23, just west of Prattsville

Houses completed in 1790
Houses on the National Register of Historic Places in New York (state)
Georgian architecture in New York (state)
Houses in Delaware County, New York
National Register of Historic Places in Delaware County, New York